Nevyansk is a town and the administrative center of Nevyansky District in Sverdlovsk Oblast, Russia, located on the Neyva River (Ob's basin) on the eastern slope of the Middle Urals,  north of Yekaterinburg. Population:    29,800 (1970).

History

The posad of Nevyansk was founded in 1700 due to the construction of a foundry and iron factory. Although it was not granted town status until 1919, it became highly important for the well-being of the Demidov family, which extracted gold from the local foothills. In the 18th century, Nevyansk was settled primarily by Old Believers, who commissioned from local artisans some glimmering, stylish icons which may be regarded as the last phase in the history of Russian icon-painting.

Administrative and municipal status
Within the framework of administrative divisions, Nevyansk serves as the administrative center of Nevyansky District and is subordinated to it. As a municipal division, the town of Nevyansk together with thirty-seven rural localities in Nevyansky District is incorporated as Nevyansky Urban Okrug.

References

Notes

Sources

External links

Official website of Nevyansk 
Unofficial website of Nevyansk 

Cities and towns in Sverdlovsk Oblast
Yekaterinburgsky Uyezd